Emmanuel Tettey Mensah (31 May 1919 – 19 July 1996), was a Ghanaian musician who was regarded as the "King of Highlife" music. He led The Tempos, a band that toured widely in West Africa.

Early years
Mensah was born at Accra, in the Gold Coast, West Africa. His early education took place at the Government School, Accra, and later at Accra High School. At the age of 12 he learned to play flute in the Government School band and in 1932 he began playing piccolo and flute in the Accra Orchestra, a schoolchildren's band. The leader of the Accra Orchestra at the time was a teacher, Joe Lamptey, who gathered talented young people together to form a band. Mensah continued to play with this orchestra and also learnt to play the alto-saxophone. His musical career was given an opportunity when he was able to finance his own musical ventures by opening a pharmacy.

E.T. Mensah also has an elder brother, Yebuah Mensah, who was the leader of a dance orchestra in the Gold Coast. Yebuah Mensah and his younger brother E.T. Mensah formed the  Accra Rhythmic Orchestra, which won the Lambeth Walk Dance Competition in 1939 at the King George Memorial Hall, now known as the Parliament House in Ghana.

The Tempos and later career

The original "Tempos" band was formed in 1946 as a "jam session" group by some European soldiers stationed in Accra. It played for army dances and at the Accra club. Over time, African musicians replaced the European ones, until finally it became an all-African band. Mensah joined the band in 1947. Shortly after this the band split up, to be reformed again with Mensah as its leader. The group gained international attention and in 1957 Mensah performed with Louis Armstrong.

The highlife style of music started to decline in the 1960s, but E. T. Mensah remained active for years afterwards. He co-starred on a highly successful album with the Nigerian trumpeter Dr Victor Abimbola Olaiya.

Discography
E. T. Mensah & The Tempos
 King of Highlife Anthology, four-CD box (2015, RetroAfrica)
Contributing artist
 The Rough Guide to West African Music (1996, World Music Network)
 The Rough Guide to Highlife (2003, World Music Network)

References

Further reading

External links
 Africa House at New York University. 
 
 
 
 
 "Best of The Beat on Afropop: E.T. Mensah, Highlife and History--Ghana’s 60th Independence Day", Afripop, 15 March 2017.

1919 births
1996 deaths
Ghanaian highlife musicians
Musicians from Accra
Ga-Adangbe people